Jan Vandrey (born 11 December 1991) is a German sprint canoeist.

He competed at the 2016 Summer Olympics in Rio de Janeiro, in the men's C-2 1000 metres. He won the gold medal with teammate Sebastian Brendel.

References

External links
 
 
 
 

1991 births
Living people
Sportspeople from Schwedt
German male canoeists
Olympic canoeists of Germany
Canoeists at the 2016 Summer Olympics
Olympic gold medalists for Germany
Olympic medalists in canoeing
Medalists at the 2016 Summer Olympics
ICF Canoe Sprint World Championships medalists in Canadian
Recipients of the Silver Laurel Leaf
European Games competitors for Germany
Canoeists at the 2019 European Games
21st-century German people